The Mont Belle Fontaine (in English: Mount beautiful fountain), culminating at  of altitude, is the highest summit of the Laurentides Wildlife Reserve.

Toponymy 
The summit owes its name to Lac Belle Fontaine located to the west.

Geography 

It is the highest point of the Jacques-Cartier Massif and the second summit of the Laurentian Mountains range, after Mount Raoul-Blanchard.

References

External links 

La Côte-de-Beaupré Regional County Municipality
Laurentides Wildlife Reserve
One-thousanders of Quebec